Charles Lowell (15 August 1782 – 20 January 1861) was a Unitarian minister and a son of judge John Lowell, as well as the father of James Russell Lowell and Robert Traill Spence Lowell.

Biography
He was born in Boston, Massachusetts, and attended The Roxbury Latin School and later Phillips Academy in Andover. He graduated from Harvard College in 1800, where he studied law and then theology. After two years in Edinburgh, Scotland and one year on the Continent, Lowell was, from 1806 until his death, pastor of the West Congregational (Unitarian) Church of Boston, a charge in which Cyrus A. Bartol was associated with him after 1837. From that year until 1840, he traveled extensively in Europe and the east. During the latter part of his life Lowell officiated only occasionally in his church.

Lowell was elected a member of the American Antiquarian Society in 1814, and served on its board of councilors from 1820 to 1853.

He married Harriet, daughter of Robert T. Spence, of Portsmouth, New Hampshire, an officer in the U. S. Navy. Harvard gave him the degree of D.D. in 1823. He was a fellow of its corporation from 1818 until 1833. He was a member of literary societies in the United States and elsewhere.  The "Proceedings" of a parish meeting that was held in his memory were published in 1861.

Almost alone, he spoke out from the pulpit against slavery to Boston's elite.

Family
He was a son of John Lowell, "The Old Judge",  and half-brother of businessman Francis Cabot Lowell. His sons included the poet James Russell Lowell and clergyman Robert Traill Spence Lowell. His daughter was Mary Lowell Putnam. His son Charles Russell Lowell married to the writer Anna Cabot Lowell and they had a daughter who died in young age around 1850.

Works
He contributed largely to periodical literature and published many separate discourses, a volume of Occasional Sermons, one of Practical Sermons (Boston, 1855), Meditations for the Afflicted, Sick, and Dying and Devotional Exercises for Communicants.

See also
 Lowell family

Notes

References

External links

  Annotated volumes of the Massachusetts Register by Charles Lowell is at the Harvard Divinity School Library at Harvard Divinity School in Cambridge, Massachusetts.

1782 births
1861 deaths
American Unitarian clergy
19th-century Christian clergy
Harvard College alumni
Alumni of the University of Edinburgh
Clergy from Boston
Members of the American Antiquarian Society
Roxbury Latin School alumni
19th-century American clergy